The International Meditation Centre (IMC) was founded by Sayagyi U Ba Khin (the first Accountant General of the Union of Burma) to promote the practice of Theravāda Buddhist vipassanā meditation. The first International Meditation Centre was opened in Rangoon (Yangon), Burma (Myanmar) in 1952, and since then five more centres were established in the UK, Western Australia, Maryland (USA), New South Wales (Australia) and Karinthia (Austria). In addition there are local groups from all over the world practising this meditation tradition today.

Background
The Venerable Webu Sayadaw, who is reputed to be an arahant in Burma, encouraged U Ba Khin to teach the Buddha-Dhamma when they first met in 1941. This exhortation was later endorsed by his own meditation teacher Saya Thetgyi. U Ba Khin wanted to devise a meditation course with instructions that would give busy householders a taste of the Dhamma with the limited free time available to them. For this, he undertook research and experiments in vipassanā meditation, and drew upon the research and experiences of his own teacher, Saya Thetgyi (who had mainly taught laypeople). He was absolutely scrupulous in ensuring that whatever he taught conforms strictly with the original teachings of the Buddha in the Tipiṭaka; and also in accordance with several widely accepted commentaries, in particular The Path of Purification (Visuddhimagga). U Ba Khin submitted his research and results from his experiments to a number of venerable Sayadaws for their review and amendment. Among those who reviewed his results and gave their official approval were Masoeyain Sayadaw (President of the Sixth Buddhist Council), Veluwun Sayadaw of Bahan (President of the Hill Tracts Buddhist Mission), Hnit Kyait Shitsu Sayadaw of Thayettaw Taik (President of the Tipiṭakadhara Exams Board and President of the All Myanmar Mahā-Saṅgha Abbots Association, Yangon) and Webu Sayadaw.

Early History
In 1950 the government of the Union of Burma issued an official circular stating that all civil service department has the option of forming Buddhist associations for the purpose of religious activities. This resulted in the establishment of the Vipassanā Association of the Accountant General’s Office in which U Ba Khin was elected president. U Ba Khin then started offering ten days meditation courses to any staff in the Accountant General Office who is interested to learn from him. As the number of meditators grew, it was soon apparent that the facilities in the Accountant General’s Office were inadequate and U Ba Khin decided to establish a separate meditation centre in the vicinity of downtown Rangoon. At that time, U Ba Khin had already attracted the attention of a number of Westerners through a series of lectures he gave in 1951 at the English Methodist Church in Rangoon. Many Westerners became interested to learn Buddhism after listening to these lectures. Since U Ba Khin was the only English-speaking teacher of vipassanā in the country, he decided to name the new centre International to give foreigners a chance to experience the practical aspects of Buddhism. On 9 November 1952, the International Meditation Centre was officiated with the dedication of the Dhamma Yaung Chi Ceti (Light of the Dhamma) pagoda.

Within the first decade of its establishment there were many prominent individuals who took meditation courses at the IMC, including Sao Shwe Thaik (the first president of the Union of Burma), U Lun Baw (Deputy Prime Minister of Burma), U San Nyun (Minister for Marine & Transport of Burma), U Bo Byi (Supreme Court Judge of Burma); and distinguished foreigners like His Excellency Mr. Eliashv Ben-Horin (Ambassador Extraordinary and Plenipotentiary for Israel, Burma), Mr. Anthony Brooke (Rajah Muda of Sarawak), Dr. Huston C. Smith (Professor of Philosophy, Massachusetts Institute of Technology), Dr. Padmanabh Jaini (Professor of Buddhist studies at UC Berkeley) and Dr. Leon E. Wright (Distinguished Professor of Religion, Howard University, Washington). They have written short notes about their meditation experience at the IMC.

The Spread Worldwide
In the 1960s, U Ba Khin’s reputation as a meditation teacher spread abroad by word of mouth of his foreign students. He started receiving invitation to teach meditation in India, United States, Holland, Germany, England, and Canada. There was also a plot of land in Hawaii that was donated for the establishment of a meditation centre. However travel restriction by the Burmese government had made it impossible for him to travel. By the 1970s, there was an increasing number of foreigners who came to take courses at IMC Rangoon. However the new restrictions meant that foreigners could only get a seven-day visas to Burma. In order to  meditate longer, some foreign students had to make a series of back-to-back seven-day trips into Rangoon, flying back and forth to Bangkok or Calcutta. This was not only expensive, but also affected the students’ progress in meditation. Mother Sayamagyi who succeeded Sayagyi U Ba Khin at the IMC after his demise, began to entertain the idea of travelling outside of Burma to teach meditation. In 1978, after a group of foreign students at the IMC made a firm determination (adhiṭṭhāna) to establish a permanent meditation centre in the West, Mother Sayamagyi started travelling abroad to teach the Dhamma. Since then she had established meditation centres throughout the world; including 5 centres with the Dhamma Yaung Chi Ceti pagoda. At present, all the meditation centres have regional teachers who were authorized by Mother Sayamagyi to conduct meditation courses.

The Meditation Practice
The meditation course taught at the IMC is the practice of the Eightfold Noble Path, which is divided into the threefold training (sikkhā) of higher morality (sīla), higher concentration (samādhi) and higher wisdom (paññā). For morality, the students will keep at least the five precepts so as to develop purity of physical and verbal conduct. During the retreat, two types of meditation are taught: calmness and control of the mind through ānāpāna meditation (to develop samādhi); followed by vipassanā (insight) meditation which leads to wisdom into the true nature of reality. The entire practice is a gradual process of mental purification, leading to the end of suffering and the realisation of full enlightenment (Nibbāna). During the course, the teaching is done through personal experience: If what the student experiences is for his well-being, he can accept it; if it is not for his well-being, he need not accept it.

Ānāpāna Meditation (Mindfulness of Breathing)
The student is first helped to develop calmness and concentration by focusing his attention on a spot where the breath touches at the base of the nose, mindfully aware of each in-breath and out-breath. When the mind is given only one object, it slowly becomes calm and steady. Gradually the breath becomes more and more subtle and the attention settles down on a small point of light and warmth. At this point, the mind becomes equanimous, clear and one-pointed (cittass’ekaggatā).

Vipassanā (Insight) Meditation
After the mind brought to a state of one-pointedness and equanimity, the student then focuses his attention into himself and examines the inherent tendencies of everything that exists within his own self. Through introspective meditation, the student:
- becomes aware of the mental and bodily components in the process of change (anicca). 
- experiences the process of change as unsatisfactory (dukkha).
- perceives the illusory nature of a permanent self (anattā).
This realization will progressively lead to detachment from the physical and mental phenomena that are experienced as constantly changing. It will gradually free the meditator from reactions such as craving and anger. It will give that peace within which will satisfy him; and help him not only to go beyond the day-to-day troubles of life, but slowly and surely beyond the limitations of life, suffering and death.

See Also
 Sayagyi U Ba Khin
 Mother Sayamagyi

Notes

References

Sources

Printed sources

Web-sources

Video-sources

External links
 Global IMC website
 Notes of Appreciation by Foreigners who took courses of Meditation at the "International Meditation Centre", 31A, Inyamyaing, Rangoon

Theravada Buddhist organizations